Octasulfur monoxide is an inorganic compound with a chemical formula S8O, discovered in 1972. It is a type of sulfur oxide.

A crystalline compound composed of cyclooctasulfur monoxide and antimony pentachloride in equimolar quantities can be made (S8O•SbCl5).

References

External links

Sulfur oxides
Eight-membered rings
Substances discovered in the 1970s